Sara Ishikawa is an architect and academic specializing in people-space relationships. She is a professor emerita at the College of Environmental Design, University of California, Berkeley. She is co-author of A Pattern Language, The Oregon Experiment and Houses Generated By Patterns.

She earned her Bachelor of Architecture degree from University of California, Berkeley.

References

Living people
American women architects
1930s births
UC Berkeley College of Environmental Design faculty
American academics of Japanese descent
UC Berkeley College of Environmental Design alumni
21st-century American women